Reader (also Reeders) is an unincorporated community in Western Mound Township, Macoupin County, Illinois, United States.  Its altitude is 581 feet (177 m), and it is located at  (39.3056022, -90.0409405).

References

Unincorporated communities in Illinois
Unincorporated communities in Macoupin County, Illinois